Arte Público Press is a publishing house associated with the University of Houston (Houston, Texas). It is the largest US publisher of contemporary and recovered literature by US Hispanic authors, publishing approximately 30 titles per year.

Arte Público was founded in 1979 by its current director, Nicolás Kanellos, Ph.D. Dr. Kanellos also founded and edited the Revista Chicana-Riqueña from 1972 to 1999. In 1980, Arte Público became a part of the University of Houston, where it is housed today. Arte Público has now published over 600 books. 

In 1990, Arte Público launched the "Recovering the U.S. Hispanic Literary Heritage" project in order to recover, index and publish lost Latino writings dating from the American colonial period to 1960. In 1994, they created Piñata Books, their children's and young adult literature imprint.

Arte Público has published Lamberto Alvarez, Victor Villaseñor, Nicholasa Mohr, Luis Valdez, Miguel Piñero, Sandra Cisneros, Julia Alvarez, Helena Maria Viramontes, Sergio Troncoso, Miguel Algarín, Graciela Limón, Gwendolyn Zepeda, Daniel Olivas, Daniel Chacón, Pat Mora, and José Ángel Gutiérrez.

Arte Público Press was honored with the 2018 Ivan Sandrof Lifetime Achievement Award given by the National Book Critics Circle Award for their work in publishing Latino authors.

The press is a member of the Community of Literary Magazines and Presses (CLMP).

Recovering the U.S. Hispanic Literary Heritage 
In 1990 an initial meeting was held to establish Recovering the U.S. Hispanic Literary Heritage, also known as The Recovery Project. This project seeks to recover and expand access to manuscripts and printed materials created by Hispanics in the United States from colonial times to 1960. The Rockefeller Foundation funded the initial meeting and the first decade of operation, along with numerous other foundations including Andrew W. Mellon Foundation, Houston Endowment Inc., and the Ford Foundation. Over 18,000 pamphlets and books written by Hispanics have been located. 1,000 books have been digitized, and over 500,000 literary items have been digitized from 1,700 periodicals.

Notable publications 

 The House on Mango Street by Sandra Cisneros
 Zoot Suit and Other Plays by Luis Valdez
 Rain of Gold by Victor Villaseñor
 Chants by Pat Mora
 y no se lo trago la tierra (And the Earth Did Not Devour Him) by Tomás Rivera

See also

 List of university presses

References

External links

Lamberto and Beto Alvarez Illustrated Book "Muffler Man"
Roll Over, Big Toben Written by Victor M. Sandoval Cover and Design Lamberto Alvarez

Book publishing companies based in Texas
University of Houston
Hispanic and Latino American literature
Publishing companies established in 1979
University presses of the United States
Literary publishing companies